Laado (English: Girl Daughter) is an Indian television soap opera finite series produced by Shakuntalam Telefilms (Season 1) and Dhaval Gada (Season 2). It aired on weekdays on Colors TV.

The show had two seasons titled Na Aana Is Des Laado (English: Never come to this country, dear) and Laado - Veerpur Ki Mardani (English: Daughter - Manlike of Veerpur).

The first season named Na Aana Is Des Laado premiered on 9 March 2009. It starred Meghna Malik, Simran Kaur, Vaishnavi Dhanraj and Yash Dasgupta. The season ended on 27 July 2012 after 870 episodes. It became one of the highest rated shows on Indian television at that time.

The second season named Laado 2 (TV series) premiered on 6 November 2017. It starred Meghna Malik, Avika Gor, Palak Jain and Shaleen Malhotra. The season ended on 23 May 2018 after 133 episodes, and was replaced by Bepannah.

Plot

Season 1 (Na Aana Is Des, Laado)
The serial is about a conflict between ignorant, manipulative and dominant woman, Ammaji (Meghna Malik) who rules a village, Veerpur with an iron fist and Sia (Natasha Sharma), an educated daughter of a doctor and a rebel against Ammaji's evil cultures. This show mainly focuses on Ammaji, her family and the evil custom of Female infanticide and rampant misogyny prevalent in the backward village. The moral of the story is about women's rights. The show portrays various social evils practiced in India.

Season 2 (Laado - Veerpur Ki Mardani)
Ammaji is back! Living a retired life with her two granddaughters Anushka (Avika Gor) and Jhanvi (Palak Jain), her only aim in life is to protect her two granddaughters. But what will happen when a wrong move by her granddaughters take her back to where it all began, Veerpur?

Cast

 Meghna Malik (seasons 1-2) as Bhagwani Devi Sangwan / Ammaji
 Simran Kaur (season 1) as Diya Raghav Sangwan née Diya Shaurya Pratap - Ammaji's granddaughter
 Vaishnavi Dhanraj (season 1) as Jhanvi Raghav Sangwan / Jhanvi Surya Rantej - Ammaji's granddaughter
 Yash Dasgupta (season 1) as Karan Vijay Chautala - Ammaji's step-grandson
 Shresth Kumar (season 1) as Aditya Gajendar Sangwan - Ammaji's grandson
  Neelam Bhagchandani / Rishina Kandhari (season 1) as Tanisha Karan Chautala - Karan's wife
 Avantika Shetty (season 1) as Ragini Aditya Sangwan - Aditya's wife
  Madhurjeet Sarghi (season 1) as Santosh Joginder Sangwan / Santosh Vijay Chautala - Ammaji's ex daughter in law 
  Rinku Vohra (season 1) as Chanda Avtaar Sangwan - Avtaar's wife 
  Aryan Pandit (season 1) as Rajbeer Avtaar Sangwan - Ammaji's grandson
 Nishant Shokeen (season 1) as Vijay Chautala - Santosh's second husband 
  Kapil Nirmal (season 1) as Surya Rana Rantej Singh - Jhanvi's husband 
  Winy Tripathi (season 1) as Inspector Vikram Singh - Diya's ex-fiancée
  Rakesh Sharma (season 1) as Yashpal - Ammaji's bodyguard
 Ankita Maheswari (season 1) as Sarah Vijay Chautala - Vijay's daughter, Santosh's step daughter
 Natasha Sharma (season 1) as Sia Raghav Sangwan
 Aditya Redij (season 1) as Raghav Sangwan - Ammaji's youngest son
 Shikha Singh (season 1) as Amba Sangwan - Ammaji's daughter, Jhanvi's adoptive mother
 Harish Verma (season 1) as Avtaar Dharamveer Sangwan - Ammaji's nephew 
  Tarun Anand / Nissar Khan (season 1) as Joginder Sangwan - Ammaji's eldest son 
 Shivangi Sharma (season 1) as Sunehri Gajendar Sangwan - Gajendar's wife 
 Anand Goradia (season 1) as Gajendar Sangwan - Ammaji's second son
  Shaikha Parween (season 1) as Jhumar Dharamveer Sangwan / Jhumar Dheeraj Singh - Ammaji's niece 
 Sonal Jha (season 1) as Sheela Dharamveer Sangwan - Ammaji's sister in law  
  Kannan Arunachalam (season 1) as Dharamveer Sangwan - Ammaji's brother  
 Aman Verma (season 1) as Bhanu Pratap Singh - Shaurya's father 
 Varun Kapoor (season 1) as Shaurya Bhanu Pratap Singh - Diya's ex-husband 
 Samiksha Bhatt (season 1) as Lovely Shaurya Pratap Singh - Shaurya's wife
 Shabana Mullani (season 1) as Bulbul Rana Rantej Singh - Rantej's second wife/mistress
 Sheeba Chaddha (season 1) as Bajri Pratap Singh - Bhanu's sister 
  Sharmilee Raj (season 1) as Dharamveer's Mistress
 Menaka Lalwani (season 1) as Rangeeli Avtaar Sangwan - Avtaar's ex-wife 
  Ayam Mehta (season 1) as Rana Rantej Singh - Surya's father 
  Anil Lalwani (season 1) as Kuldeep Rana Rantej Singh - Surya's brother, Jhanvi's ex-husband 
 Deepraj Rana (season 1) as DK Vora  
  Pratik Mitra (season 1) as Chamkila Kuldeep Singh - Kuldeep's boyfriend 
  Shobhit Attray (season 1) as Param Rana Rantej Singh - Surya's brother, Jhanvi's ex-husband 
  Dhruv Lather (season 1) as Dheeraj Singh - Jhumar's husband 
 Karmveer Choudhary (season 1) as Dev's Father 
  Rahul Singh (season 1) as Satpal - Rantej's right-hand man
  Deeya Chopra (season 1) as Sonali - Raghav's ex-fiancée
  Janvi Sangwan (season 1) as Shivlaali Rana Rantej Singh - Rantej's first wife
  Deepak Sandhu (season 1) as Raj 
 Lankesh Bhardwaj / Sanjay Bhardwaj (season 1) as Kishanlal
  Bhavin Wadia (season 1) as Shera - Amba's right-hand man
 Rocky Verma (season 1) as Contract Killer
  Shahab Khan (season 1) as Dr. Devi Singh - Sia's Father
  Reema Vohra (season 1) as Vaidhei Devi Singh - Sia's sister
 Suraj Jadhav (season 1) as Wrestler - one of the lead pehlewan
 Avika Gor (season 2) as Anushka Yuvraj Choudhary (née Sangwan) - Ammaji's elder granddaughter
 Shaleen Malhotra (season 2) as Yuvraj Singh Choudhary - Anushka's husband
 Siddharth Arora (season 2) as Shaurya - Juhi's lover
 Vinny Arora (season 2) as Juhi Sethi - Indra's molestation victim
 Rituraj Singh (season 2) as Balwant Singh Choudhary - Malhari's husband
 Zalak Desai (season 2) as Komal Dharam Kriplani (née Choudhary) - Yuvraj's younger sister
 Charu Asopa (season 2) as Kajal Kuldeep Sethi - Kuldeep's wife
 Palak Jain (season 2) as Jhanvi Sangwan - Anushka's younger sister
 Ankit Raaj (season 2) as Ranveer Balwant Choudhary - Rantej's younger brother
 Adhvik Mahajan (season 2) as Dr. Vishal - Meera's friend
 Farida Dadi (season 2) as Kavita Sethi - Juhi's paternal grandmother
 Ashu Sharma (season 2) as Amrish - Shagun's younger brother
 Arjun Aneja (season 2) as Kuldeep Sethi - Shagun's son
 Mamta Luthra / Unknown (season 2) as Taai - Juhi's nanny 
 Unknown (season 2) as Bunty - Shaurya's friend
 Nasirr Khan (season 2) as Advocate Dharam Kriplani - Komal's husband
 Manini Mishra (season 2) as Shagun Sethi - Juhi's stepmother
 Ananya Khare (season 2) as Malhari Balwant Choudhary - Balwant's wife
 Nimai Bali (season 2) as Indra Baba - Malhari's second husband
 Dakssh Ajit Singh (season 2) as Rantej Balwant Choudhary - Balwant and Malhari's elder son 
 Saii Ranade Sane (season 2) as Meera Rantej Choudhary - Rantej's wife
 Hemann Choudhary (season 2) as Tej Choudhary - Dushyant's son
 Moni Rai (season 2) as Dushyant Singh Choudhary - Balwant's younger brother 
 Gulfam Khan (season 2) as Rajjo - Balwant's younger sister 
 Simran Natekar (season 2) as Chunki - Dhumal's wife
 Paaras Madaan (season 2) as Jai Dev
 Kapil Soni (season 2) as Jai's Elder Brother
 Sudipti Parmar (season 2) as Jai's Elder Brother's Wife
 Prakash (season 2) as Dhumal - Saroj's son
 Meenal Kapoor (season 2) as Saroj - Ammaji's friend
 Ahmad Harhash Season 2 as Ram Chatturvedi Ammaji’s friend

References

Indian television soap operas